On October 18, 1998, a pipeline explosion occurred in the community of Jesse (geographical coordinates ),  southeast of Lagos, Nigeria. The cause of the blast has been debated. The Nigerian government stated the explosion took place after scavengers intentionally ruptured the pipeline with their tools and ignited the blaze; however, others have stated the pipeline ruptured due to a lack of maintenance and neglect with a cigarette igniting the fire. With 1,082 deaths attributed to the blast, the 1998 Jesse explosion has the distinction of being the most deadly pipeline explosion to have occurred in Nigeria.

After igniting on October 18, the fire burned until a firefighting company from the United States was able to extinguish the blaze on October 23 with a nitrogen-rich foam. During a visit on October 19, Nigerian President Abdulsalami Abubakar promised to provide the necessary support to give aid in addition to develop solutions to prevent these types of tragedies from occurring again.

Weeks after the explosion, the death toll continued to rise as many of those with injuries died while in hospitals, while others fled care as a result of fearing arrest by the Nigerian government on suspicion of igniting the blaze. Due to the intensity of the blaze, many victims were too badly burned to be identified, and as a result over 300 bodies were buried in mass graves.

See also
 List of pipeline accidents

References

Explosions in 1998
Jesse pipeline explosion, 1998
Jesse pipeline explosion, 1998
Jesse pipeline explosion, 1998
Pipeline accidents
Deaths caused by petroleum looting
October 1998 events in Nigeria
1998 disasters in Nigeria